Maryland Route 317 (MD 317) is a state highway in the U.S. state of Maryland.  Known as Burrsville Road, the state highway runs  from MD 313 in Oil City east to the Delaware state line in Burrsville, where the highway continues east as Delaware Route 14 (DE 14).  MD 317 was constructed in the mid-1920s and realigned through Burrsville around 1960.

Route description

MD 317 begins at an intersection with MD 313 (Greensboro Road) in Oil City.  The state highway heads east as a two-lane undivided road through farmland.  MD 317 crosses Webber Branch before the old alignment, Ruritan Road, splits to the northeast as the highway approaches Burrsville.  The old alignment, now part of Knife Box Road, crosses MD 317 again shortly before the route comes to its eastern terminus at the Delaware state line.  The highway continues east as DE 14 (Vernon Road) toward the city of Harrington.

History
MD 317 was paved in 1925 and 1926 along its whole length.  The state highway originally performed an S-curve through Burrsville, following present day Ruritan Road and Knife Box Road, the latter of which was designated MD 457 north of MD 317 between 1951 and 1960.  MD 317 was constructed on its present straight alignment through Burrsville around 1960.

Junction list

See also

References

External links

MDRoads: MD 317
MD 317 at AARoads.com

317
Maryland Route 317